Oleh Vasylyovych Kazmyrchuk (born on 4 December 1968) was a Kyrgyzstani and Ukrainian footballer who was a midfielder for FC Akzhayik Astana. He was a member of the Kyrgyzstan national football team, earning two caps in 1992.

External links
Player profile – ffu.org.ua
Player profile – klisf.info

1968 births
Living people
Soviet footballers
Ukrainian footballers
Kyrgyzstani footballers
Kyrgyzstan international footballers
Kyrgyzstani expatriate footballers
Expatriate footballers in Ukraine
Expatriate footballers in Bulgaria
Ukrainian Premier League players
FC Alga Bishkek players
FC Dnipro Cherkasy players
FC Kremin Kremenchuk players
FC Nyva Ternopil players
Kyrgyzstani people of Ukrainian descent
Association football midfielders